Events from the year 1991 in Canada.

Incumbents

Crown 
 Monarch – Elizabeth II

Federal government 
 Governor General – Ray Hnatyshyn 
 Prime Minister – Brian Mulroney
 Chief Justice – Antonio Lamer (Quebec) 
 Parliament – 34th

Provincial governments

Lieutenant governors 
Lieutenant Governor of Alberta – Helen Hunley (until March 11) then Gordon Towers  
Lieutenant Governor of British Columbia – David Lam
Lieutenant Governor of Manitoba – George Johnson 
Lieutenant Governor of New Brunswick – Gilbert Finn 
Lieutenant Governor of Newfoundland – James McGrath (until November 5) then Frederick Russell 
Lieutenant Governor of Nova Scotia – Lloyd Crouse 
Lieutenant Governor of Ontario – Lincoln Alexander (until December 11) then Hal Jackman 
Lieutenant Governor of Prince Edward Island – Marion Reid 
Lieutenant Governor of Quebec – Martial Asselin 
Lieutenant Governor of Saskatchewan – Sylvia Fedoruk

Premiers 
Premier of Alberta – Don Getty  
Premier of British Columbia – Bill Vander Zalm (until April 2) then Rita Johnston (April 2 to November 5) then Mike Harcourt 
Premier of Manitoba – Gary Filmon 
Premier of New Brunswick – Frank McKenna 
Premier of Newfoundland – Clyde Wells 
Premier of Nova Scotia – Roger Bacon (until February 26) then Donald Cameron 
Premier of Ontario – Bob Rae 
Premier of Prince Edward Island – Joe Ghiz 
Premier of Quebec – Robert Bourassa 
Premier of Saskatchewan – Grant Devine (until November 1) then Roy Romanow

Territorial governments

Commissioners 
 Commissioner of Yukon –  John Kenneth McKinnon 
 Commissioner of Northwest Territories – Daniel L. Norris

Premiers 
Premier of the Northwest Territories – Dennis Patterson (until November 14) then Nellie Cournoyea
Premier of Yukon – Tony Penikett

Events

January to June
January 1 – The Goods and Services Tax comes into effect.
January 15 – Canadian Forces begin their participation in the Persian Gulf War.
January 29 – The Allaire Committee releases its report on Canada's constitution: it recommends the transfer of many powers from the federal government to the provinces.
January 30 – Gulf War: A Canadian CF-18 Hornet attacks and causes irreparable damage to an Iraqi warship.
February 26 – Donald Cameron becomes premier of Nova Scotia, replacing Roger Bacon.
February 27 – Gulf War: Iraq agrees to a cease-fire ending the conflict.
April 2 – Rita Johnston becomes premier of British Columbia, replacing Bill Vander Zalm. She is the first woman premier in Canada.
April 22 – Joe Clark is appointed Minister responsible for Constitutional Affairs.
May – George Erasmus, leader of the Assembly of First Nations, resigns and is succeeded by Ovide Mercredi.
May 14 – MP John Nunziata alleges the Royal Canadian Mounted Police (RCMP) know who bombed the Air-India flight 182 but did not have evidence needed for prosecution.
June 11 – The Quebec sovereigntist party Bloc Québécois is founded by Lucien Bouchard.
June 15 – Paul Bernardo kidnaps, rapes, and murders Leslie Mahaffy.
June 19 – The Dobbie-Castonguay Commission is created to look into changes to the constitution.

July to December
July 3 – The process leading to the privatization of Petro-Canada is begun.
July 27 – Greg Welch (AUS) and Sue Schlatter (CAN) win the 1991 ITU Triathlon World Cup race (1.5 km swim, 40 km bike, 10 km run) in Vancouver.
August 4 – Brad Beven (AUS) and Karen Smyers (USA) win the 1991 ITU Triathlon World Cup race (1.5 km swim, 40 km bike, 10 km run) in Toronto.
September 24 – Dobbie-Castonguay Commission recommends an elected Senate and recognizing Quebec as a distinct society.
October 21 – The Saskatchewan election: Roy Romanow's NDP win a majority, defeating Grant Devine's PCs.
November 1 – Roy Romanow becomes premier of Saskatchewan, replacing Grant Devine.
November 5 – Michael Harcourt becomes premier of British Columbia, replacing Rita Johnston.
November 14 – Nellie Cournoyea becomes government leader of the Northwest Territories, replacing Dennis Patterson, the first woman to do so, first female premier of a Canadian territory and the second female premier in Canadian history after Rita Johnston of British Columbia.
November 24 – At the 79th Grey Cup the Toronto Argonauts defeat the Calgary Stampeders at Winnipeg Stadium in Winnipeg.
December 7 – A Bunch of Munsch premieres on CTV.

Full date unknown
Jean-Bertrand Aristide, the President of Haiti, visits Canada and is warmly welcomed by the large Haitian community in Montreal, where he had studied at the Université de Montréal.
Julius Alexander Isaac is named Chief Justice of the Federal Court of Canada. He becomes the first Black Chief Justice in Canada.
David Schindler of the University of Alberta wins the first international Stockholm Water Prize for environmental research.
Ferguson Jenkins becomes the first Canadian elected to the Baseball Hall of Fame.
Canadian peacekeepers begin a five-year deployment to El Salvador.
Canadian observers are sent to Western Sahara.
News media: eye weekly created in Toronto.

Arts and literature

New works
Rohinton Mistry: Such a Long Journey
Douglas Coupland: Generation X: Tales for an Accelerated Culture
Margaret Atwood: Wilderness Tips
Dave Duncan: Faery Lands Forlorn
Hume Cronyn: A Terrible Liar
Spider Robinson: Starseed

Awards
See 1991 Governor General's Awards for a complete list of winners and finalists for those awards.
Books in Canada First Novel Award: Nino Ricci, Lives of the Saints
Gerald Lampert Award: Diana Brebner, Radiant Life Forms
Geoffrey Bilson Award: Marianne Brandis, The Sign of the Scales
Marian Engel Award: Joan Clark
Pat Lowther Award: Karen Connelly, The Small Words in My Body
Stephen Leacock Award: Howard White, Waiting in the Rain
Trillium Book Award: Margaret Atwood, Wilderness Tips
Vicky Metcalf Award: Brian Doyle

Film
Atom Egoyan's The Adjuster is released
James Cameron's Terminator 2: Judgment Day is released. It is the year's highest-grossing film

Music
Trevor Pinnock becomes director of the National Arts Centre Orchestra

Sport
May 19 – Spokane Chiefs win their first Memorial Cup by defeating the Drummondville Voltigeurs 5 to 1. The final game was played at Colisée de Québec in Quebec City, Quebec
May 25 – Montreal, Quebec's Mario Lemieux of the Pittsburgh Penguins is awarded the Conn Smythe Trophy
November 24 – Toronto Argonauts win their twelfth Grey Cup  by defeating the Calgary Stampeders in the 79th Grey Cup played at Winnipeg Stadium in Winnipeg. Toronto's Dave Sapunjis was awarded the game's Most Valuable Canadian in a losing effort
November 30 – Wilfrid Laurier Golden Hawks win their first Vanier Cup by defeating the Mount Allison Mounties 25 to 18 in the 27th Vanier Cup

Births
January 13 – Kyle Clifford, ice hockey player
January 16 – Matt Duchene, hockey player
January 18 – Britt McKillip, actress and musician
January 21 – Brittany Tiplady, actress
January 25 – Jared Cowen, ice hockey player
February 12 
 Tanaya Beatty, actress
 Ryan Kavanagh, ice hockey defenceman
March 10 – Landon Liboiron, actor
March 13 – Tristan Thompson, basketball player 
March 14 
 Rhiannon Fish, actress
 Greta Onieogou, actress  
April 7 – Michelle Monkhouse, fashion model (died 2011)
April 19 – Kelly Olynyk, basketball player
April 22 – Aqsa Parvez, murder victim (died 2007)
May 8 – Ethan Gage, soccer player
May 10 – Jordan Francis, singer, dancer, actor, and choreographer
May 11 – Johnathon Robert Madden, murder victim (died 2003)
May 17 - Abigail Raye, field hockey player
May 29 – Jesse Camacho, actor
May 31 – Pierre-Luc Dusseault, politician
June 19 – Hilary Bell, swimmer
June 29 – Tajja Isen, actress
July 13 – Mackenzie Boyd-Clowes, ski jumper
July 20 – Andrew Shaw, ice hockey player
July 24 – Emily Bett Rickards, actress
August 6 – Kacey Rohl, actress
August 18 – Richard Harmon, actor
August 22 – Brayden Schenn, ice hockey player
August 23 – Jennifer Abel, diver
September 2 – Emma Lunder, biathlete
September 8 – Nicole Dollanganger, singer-songwriter
September 16 – Alexandra Paul, ice dancer
October 30 – Aliza Vellani, television actress
October 31 – Patricia Obee, rower
November 10 – Genevieve Buechner, actress
November 13 – Devon Bostick, actor
November 14
Miriam Brouwer, cyclist
Taylor Hall, ice hockey player
November 25 – Disguised Toast, Taiwanese-Canadian video game streamer, YouTuber, and Internet personality
November 28 – Ian Beharry, pair skater
December 12 – Daniel Magder, actor
December 17 – Léo Bureau-Blouin, politician

Deaths

January to June
January 1 – Larry Condon, politician (born 1936)
January 23 – Northrop Frye, literary critic and literary theorist (born 1912)
February 7 – Jean-Paul Mousseau, artist (born 1927)
February 11 – Pete Parker, radio announcer (born 1895)
February 20 – Eugene Forsey, politician and constitutional expert (born 1904)
April 26 – Richard Hatfield, politician and 26th Premier of New Brunswick (born 1931)
May 9 – Loran Ellis Baker, politician (born 1905)
June 11 – David Croll, politician (born 1900)
June 16 – Leslie Mahaffy, murder victim (born 1976)

July to December

July 8 – Gordon Stewart Anderson, writer (born 1958)
July 10 – Grace MacInnis, politician and feminist (born 1905)
August 6 – Roland Michener, lawyer, politician diplomat and Governor-General of Canada (born 1900)
August 22 – Colleen Dewhurst, actress (born 1924)
August 31 – Cliff Lumsdon, world champion marathon swimmer (born 1931)
September 12 – Albert Bruce Matthews, commander of the 2nd Canadian Infantry Division during the Second World War (born 1909)
September 25 – Stanley Waters, Senator (born 1920)
October 2 – Hazen Argue, politician (born 1921)
October 26 – Sherry Hawco, artistic gymnast (born 1964)

November 13 – Paul-Émile Léger, Cardinal of the Roman Catholic Church (born 1904)
December 17 – Armand Frappier, physician and microbiologist (born 1904)

See also
 1991 in Canadian television
 List of Canadian films of 1991

References

 
Years of the 20th century in Canada
Canada
1991 in North America